Juan Bautista Torres (born 2 April 2002) is an Argentine tennis player.

Torres has a career high ATP singles ranking of 288 achieved on 17 June 2022. He also has a career high doubles ranking of 439 achieved on 25 October 2021.

Torres has won 1 ATP Challenger doubles title at the 2021 Challenger de Buenos Aires with Luciano Darderi.

ATP Challenger and ITF World Tennis Tour finals

Singles: 6 (4–2)

Doubles 6 (1–5)

References

External links
 
 

2002 births
Living people
Tennis players from Buenos Aires
Argentine male tennis players
21st-century Argentine people